Shiva Kirti Singh (born 13 November 1951) is an Indian Judge. He is former Chairperson of Telecom Disputes Settlement and Appellate Tribunal. He has served as Judge of Supreme Court of India. He has also served as Chief Justice of Allahabad High Court, Acting Chief Justice of  Allahabad High Court and Patna High Court and Judge of Allahabad High Court and Patna High Court.

References

1951 births
Living people
Justices of the Supreme Court of India
Chief Justices of the Allahabad High Court
20th-century Indian judges
21st-century Indian judges